Strigocis is a genus of minute tree-fungus beetles in the family Ciidae. There are at least five described species in Strigocis.

Species
These five species belong to the genus Strigocis:
 Strigocis bicornis (Mellié, 1848) g
 Strigocis bilimeki (Reitter, 1878) i c g
 Strigocis opacicollis Dury, 1917 i c g b
 Strigocis opalescens (Casey, 1898) i c g
 Strigocis tokunagai Nobuchi, 1960
Data sources: i = ITIS, c = Catalogue of Life, g = GBIF, b = Bugguide.net

References

Further reading

 
 
 
 
 
 
 

Ciidae genera